Dennis Harper (born 12 October 1936) is an English former professional footballer who played in the Football League for Birmingham City. Primarily an inside forward, Harper also played non-league football for clubs including Darlaston, Romford, Burton Albion, Nuneaton Borough, Stafford Rangers and Brierley Hill Alliance.

Life and career
Harper was born in Wednesbury, Staffordshire. He signed amateur forms with Aston Villa in February 1954, and also played football for Darlaston. Harper signed amateur forms with Birmingham City at the start of the 1955–56 season, and turned professional the following August despite still having six months left of his National Service commitments with the RAF.

He was brought into the travelling party on 20 February as cover in case Bolton Wanderers' pitch proved too firm for Peter Murphy's troublesome knee; it was, Harper made his First Division debut, and Birmingham lost 3–1. He was transfer-listed at the end of the next season, but re-signed in June after joint manager Arthur Turner gave him another chance, believing that "the frail-looking Harper could make the grade if he put a bit more snap in his game." He made no more senior appearances, and was again transfer-listed at the end of the 1958–59 season. Despite interest from Fourth Division club Torquay United and Arthur Turner's new employers, Headington United of the Southern League, Harper signed for Romford, in their first season as a professional club.

He helped Romford win the Southern League Division One title, and scored seven goals from 50 appearances before leaving the club in the middle of the next season to join Burton Albion. He moved on again in the close season to Nuneaton Borough, managed by his former Birmingham team-mate Jack Badham, and played regularly at the start of the season, but was transfer-listed in December. He did not leave, and made three more appearances in March 1962, before being given a free transfer at the end of the campaign. He joined Stafford Rangers, but found the travelling to training too onerous, and switched to Brierley Hill Alliance in September 1962.

References

Sources
 

1936 births
Living people
Sportspeople from Wednesbury
English footballers
Association football forwards
Darlaston Town F.C. players
Birmingham City F.C. players
Romford F.C. players
Burton Albion F.C. players
Nuneaton Borough F.C. players
Stafford Rangers F.C. players
Brierley Hill Alliance F.C. players
English Football League players
Southern Football League players